The OFC U-20 Championship 1982 was held in Papua New Guinea. It also served as qualification for the intercontinental play-off for the 1983 FIFA World Youth Championship.

Teams
The following teams entered the tournament:

 
 
 
  (host)

Group stage

Third place match

Final

Qualification to World Youth Championship
Australia qualified for the 1983 FIFA World Youth Championship by winning an intercontinental play-off against Israel and Costa Rica. Matches were played in Costa Rica.

References

External links
Results by RSSSF

1982
Under 20
1982
1982 in Papua New Guinean sport
1982 in New Zealand association football
1982 in Australian soccer
1982 in youth association football